The Opéra de Lille is a neo-classical opera house, built from 1907 to 1913 and officially inaugurated in 1923. Closed for renovation in 1998 it reopened in 2003 for Lille 2004. The Opéra de Lille is a member of the European Network for Opera, Music and Dance Education (RESEO), and of Opera Europa. It is served by the metro stations Gare Lille-Flandres and Rihour.

History 

Lille became French in 1668 through the Aix-la-Chapelle treaty. The classical singing activity grew quickly. Shows are organised in the city hall by the composer Pascal Collasse. In 1700, the opera room is destroyed and rebuilt thanks to a gift of 90,000 florins by Louis XIV.

At the end of the 18th century, a bigger opera room is designed by the architect Lequeux, inaugurated in 1788.

In 1903 fire destroyed the 1785 Lille opera house. For the replacement city officials chose architect Louis Marie Cordonnier by competition. The interior includes sculptures by Edgar-Henri Boutry, and frescoes by Georges Picard.

In July 1914, while not quite completed, the Germans occupied the city during World War I and commandeered much of the furniture and equipment of the Opéra to furnish the other opera in Lille, the Theatre Sebastopol.  After four years of occupation, the building was restored and reopened its doors in 1923 for a rededication as the Grand Theatre and a "première française".

At the end of 1970's the classical singing activity struggles. To relaunch it, an association is created in 1979 with Roubaix's ballet and Tourcoing's opera studio. It creates the "Opéra du Nord" directed by Elie Delfosse. It is opened with Il Trovatore by Verdi for the 1979–1980 season. This new opera is a success, the number of subscribers jumped from 700 to 3000 within three years. However, from the beginning financial problems jeopardise its existence. In 1984 a restructuring fires a part of the employees. The association is dissolved in 1985 because of financial problems and political discord.

The Opera de Lille is then directed by Humbert Camerlo who started an ambitious programmation with among others: Mozart's Cosi van Tutti, Stravinsky's The Rake's Progress.

In 1987 the opera is closed for financial reasons, the orchestra and the chorus are fired.

In 1998 the theatre's physical condition required an emergency closure, in mid-season.  Renovations evolved into a more ambitious project to improve the building's functional capabilities for the public and for performing artists. This project was complete in time for Lille's year as European Capital of Culture in 2004.

See also
Le Concert d'Astrée

External links
The company's official website (in English) 
  The building's history (in French)

Lille
Buildings and structures in Lille
Tourist attractions in Lille
Theatres completed in 1923
Music venues completed in 1923
1923 establishments in France
20th-century architecture in France